Dolphin Computer Access is a British company based in Worcester that designs, creates and sells software for people who are blind or have vision and print impairments, dyslexia and other specific learning difficulties. The company was set up in 1986 and now has offices in the United Kingdom, United States, Sweden and Norway. Through the use of Dolphin's screen enlargers, screen readers and braille output, users can operate word processors, spreadsheets, databases and the internet. The company's customers include Microsoft, the Inland Revenue, the BBC, the Royal Air Force, New College Worcester and Vodafone.

Dolphin's product SuperNova has won the UK WOW! award for technology in education.

In 2005 Dolphin worked alongside BT and the National Library for the Blind to develop a prototype synthetic voice application enabling books, magazines and newspapers to be converted into audio format, thus enabling them to be read by visually impaired computer users.

In 2008 the company announced a merger with Durham based Software Express Distribution Limited, a software development company and producer of Guide, a software package which enables visually impaired users to access Windows.

References

External links
 

Software companies of the United Kingdom
Companies based in Worcestershire
Blindness equipment
Companies established in 1986
1986 establishments in the United Kingdom